United States v. Kozminski, 487 U.S. 931 (1988), was a United States Supreme Court case involving the Thirteenth Amendment to the United States Constitution and involuntary servitude. 

Ike and Margarethe Kozminski and their son John were accused of enslaving two men on their farm. 
A federal jury convicted the husband and wife of holding the men against their will and conspiring to do so, and John was convicted on the conspiracy charge. The case was appealed to the U.S. Supreme Court.

The Supreme Court held that the jury had been improperly instructed as to the nature of involuntary servitude under existing law and remanded the case for a new trial. The defendants eventually pleaded guilty to misdemeanor violations of labor law.

See also
 List of United States Supreme Court cases, volume 487
 List of United States Supreme Court cases
 Lists of United States Supreme Court cases by volume
 List of United States Supreme Court cases by the Rehnquist Court

References

External links 

United States Supreme Court cases
United States Supreme Court cases of the Rehnquist Court
United States Thirteenth Amendment case law
1988 in United States case law